Țibana is a commune in Iași County, Western Moldavia, Romania. It is composed of ten villages: Alexeni, Domnița, Gârbești, Moara Ciornei, Oproaia, Poiana Mănăstirii, Poiana de Sus, Runcu, Țibana and Vadu Vejei.

References

Communes in Iași County
Localities in Western Moldavia